= Jenky, West Virginia =

- Unincorporated community
- Location within West Virginia Location within the United States
- Coordinates: 38°8′58″N 80°59′41″W
- Country: United States
- State: West Virginia
- County: Fayette
- Elevation: 1,841 ft (561 m)
- Time zone: UTC-5 (Eastern (EST))
  - Summer (DST): UTC-4 (EDT)
- GNIS ID: 1556128

Jenky is an unincorporated community in Fayette County, West Virginia, United States.

The community was named after a former classmate of an early settler.
